Amar Bahadur Thapa is a Nepali politician belonging to the CPN (Unified Socialist). He was a member of 2nd Nepalese Constituent Assembly. He won the Dailekh–1 seat in the 2013 Nepalese Constituent Assembly election from Communist Party of Nepal (Unified Marxist–Leninist).

References

Communist Party of Nepal (Unified Socialist) politicians
Living people
Members of the Provincial Assembly of Karnali Province
Members of the 2nd Nepalese Constituent Assembly
Nepal MPs 2022–present
1956 births